Swashbucklers of the 7 Skies is a role-playing game by Chad Underkoffler, published by Evil Hat Productions in 2009.

Description
Swashbucklers of the 7 Skies is a swashbuckling RPG set in a fantasy world of islands floating in the sky, which offers players the chance to heroically adventure across the heavens. Swashbucklers was an homage to the pulp swashbuckling genre, with a full chapter spent on the tropes of the genre. Swashbucklers included a fully original setting, of sky pirates in flying ships battling across a world where islands float in the sky. The game uses Chad Underkoffler's PDQ system, which shared some characteristics with Fate – such as its use of Fortes (or qualities), which could be freeform occupations, motivations, histories or organizations. Although Swashbucklers used PDQ, it was a new variant of the system that Underkoffler called PDQ#; for the first time, Underkoffler dramatically revamped his house mechanics, as PDQ# gave characters foibles and techniques and changed conflict into a more tactical system. Because of the specific needs of the setting, Swashbucklers also had a well-received ship combat system.

Publication history
Chad Underkoffler had been working on a game about sky pirates as his first independent RPG for Atomic Sock Monkey Press, but put the game aside to develop Dead Inside (2004) instead. As a result of a business arrangement between Atomic Sock Monkey and Evil Hat Productions, Underkoffler was finally able to publish his game as Swashbucklers of the 7 Skies in 2009. The joint arrangement to produce the game went smoothly, although there was a disagreement over the size; Evil Hat's Fred Hicks was ultimately able to convince Underkoffler to go with a 7" x 10" format, which was a little smaller than a traditional RPG.

Reception
Shannon Appelcline, in his 2011 book Designers & Dragons, noted that this was a more traditional RPG for Evil Hat, and commented: "Whereas The Zorcerer of Zo had received some criticism for its rough development of superb ideas, Swashbucklers of the 7 Skies was a more polished game, showing the benefits of indie designers working together in a larger design house." After its publication, Swashbucklers received a Silver ENnie, and was runner-up for the Indie Game of the Year.

References

Campaign settings
ENnies winners
Evil Hat Productions games
Fantasy role-playing games
Indie role-playing games
Multigenre Swashbuckler role-playing games
Role-playing games introduced in 2009